Swamp of Love is the third studio album released by the Canadian garage rock band Deja Voodoo.

Track listing

"Blast Off!"
"Endless Sleep"
"New Kind of Mambo"
"Pig Fat Papa"
"Place I Live"
"White Sugar"
"Wasn't That a Fish"
"Love Me Now"
"Shoobedy Hey"
"Coelecanth" [sic]
"Three Men, One Coffin"
"Swamp of Love"
"Baby Please Don't Go"
"Cat That's Gone to the Dogs"
"Black Dress"
"Bad Book"
"Carfish"
"Stuff"
"Dead Daddy Dead"
"Where I've Been (Tonight)"
"Don't Let No Ning Heads in Your Home"
"Viet Cong"

Source .

Personnel
 Tony Dewald, drums
 Gerard van Herk, guitar/voice

References 

1986 albums
Deja Voodoo (Canadian band) albums
Og Music albums